The Aldersbach brewery (German ) is a traditional medium-sized brewery in Aldersbach, Lower Bavaria, opened in the 13th century. It produces beer types such as Dunkel, Helles, and Pilsner, plus seasonal Bock and Pale lagers. In 2016, it won awards from the Bavarian Brewers Association and the Bavarian State Beer Exhibition.

History

The origins of the Aldersbach brewery, in the Klosterwinkel region close to Passau, go back to the High Middle Ages. In 1146, monks from Ebrach founded the Aldersbach Abbey. In a short time the place grew into an economic, cultural, and spiritual center.

Soon after the monastery was founded, the monks started brewing beer. As early as 1268, the brewery was documented in an arbitration letter from Count Albert von Hals. This makes the Aldersbach brewery one of the oldest breweries in the world. Nevertheless, the main drink until the 16th century was wine, which was also grown in the area around Aldersbach. Climate changes and phylloxera disasters put an end to viticulture and beer became the main and popular drink in Bavaria. Until then, the monastery breweries were primarily responsible for the production of beer and the supply of the population, but from this point onward, castle breweries were established in many places, some of which still exist today.

In the 17th century there was government intervention in the brewing rights. Even Aldersbach had to fear for its brewing rights, since the corresponding certificate was lost in the Thirty Years' War. In 1644, the monastery was re-confirmed by Elector Maximilian I. The increasing consumption of beer made it necessary to build a new brewhouse in 1734. The brewery museum is housed in this building today. In 1780 a new beer cellar was built.

Secularization hit Aldersbach hard: in 1803 the monastery was dissolved and the brewery was initially sold to a beer brewer from Passau. A few years later, in 1811, Johann Adam von Aretin acquired the monastery brewery; as early as 1806 he had bought forest and arable land around Heidelberg Palace. The brewery is still owned by the family to this day.

In the course of the 19th century many smaller breweries in the area were bought up; Further acquisitions were made after the First World War and in the 1950s and 1960s, including the breweries in Gossersdorf and Konzell (Straubing-Bogen district) and a brewery in Lam (Cham (district)). The Aldersbach brewery, which has been run as a GmbH & Co KG since 1 January 2005, is still owned by the von Aretin family and is one of the most successful breweries in Bavaria today. In the summer of 2008, large parts of the Passau Peschl Brewery was bought, and since then the Aldersbach brewery has been supplying the former customers of Peschl-Bräu with their beverages. The Aldersbacher Bräustüberl is particularly well-known, as you can bring your own snacks there.

In 2016, the Bavarian State Exhibition "Beer in Bavaria" took place in Aldersbach. Both the historical and the modern brewery part could be visited. In 2018, the Aldersbach brewery celebrated its 750th anniversary.

Products
:

Beers

Soft drinks

Awards
In 2016, the brewery received the Golden Beer Idea  award from the Bavarian Brewers Association and the Bavarian Hotel and Restaurant Association, and the House of Bavarian History award from the Bavarian State Beer Exhibition.

See also
List of brewing companies in Germany

References

External links

 
 2016 Beer in Bavaria passauer-land.de

Breweries in Germany
Companies based in Bavaria
Beer brands of Germany